The vitelline masked weaver (Ploceus vitellinus) is a species of bird in the family Ploceidae.
It is found in western, central and eastern Africa.

Gallery

References

External links
 Vitelline masked weaver -  Species text in Weaver Watch.

vitelline masked weaver
Birds of Sub-Saharan Africa
vitelline masked weaver
Taxonomy articles created by Polbot